Hakan Peker (born February 5, 1961) is a Turkish dancer, songwriter, singer, and music composer.

Discography

Released albums
 Bir Efsane  (April 1989)
 Camdan Cama (March 1990)
 Düş ve Fantezi (September 1990)
 Hey Corç (Seni Unutmalı) (August 14, 1991)
 Amma Velakin (November 1993)
 Hakan Peker''' (June 8, 1995)
 Salına Salına (July 1997)
 İlla ki (February 16, 2000)
 Canım İstedi (October 28, 2001)
 Aşk Bana Lazım (May 2003)
 Yak Beni (September 1, 2004)
 Gece Gözlüm (July 21, 2006)
 Hakan Peker 2011 (July 7, 2011)
 Mütemadiyen (May 2014)

 Singles
 Taş Gibi (July 2004)
 Mütemadiyen (May 2014)
 Bir Yuva Kurmadık (June 2017)

 Compilation albums
 Dünden Bugüne Hakan Peker (December 1998)
 Efsane Şarkılar'' (April 7, 2016)

Music videos

References

1961 births
Musicians from Istanbul
Turkish male singers
Turkish pop singers
Turkish-language singers
Living people